Dane Šijan (born 5 February 1977) is a Serbian former handball player.

Club career
Over the course of his career that spanned more than two decades, Šijan played for Metaloplastika, Proleter Zrenjanin, Rudar Kostolac, Partizan (2001–2003), IF Guif (2003–2005), Viborg HK (2005–2007 and 2008–2012), SG Flensburg-Handewitt (2007–2008), Bjerringbro-Silkeborg (2012–2014), Mors-Thy (2014–2016) and Dobrogea Sud Constanța (2016–2018).

International career
At international level, Šijan represented Serbia and Montenegro at the 2004 European Championship. He played for Serbia since its inception in 2006 until 2008.

Honours
Partizan
 Handball Championship of FR Yugoslavia: 2001–02, 2002–03
Dobrogea Sud Constanța
 Cupa României: 2017–18
 Supercupa României: 2017

References

External links
 

1977 births
Living people
Sportspeople from Šabac
Serbian male handball players
RK Metaloplastika players
RK Proleter Zrenjanin players
RK Partizan players
Viborg HK players
SG Flensburg-Handewitt players
HC Dobrogea Sud Constanța players
Handball-Bundesliga players
Expatriate handball players
Serbian expatriate sportspeople in Sweden
Serbian expatriate sportspeople in Denmark
Serbian expatriate sportspeople in Germany
Serbian expatriate sportspeople in Romania